The pygmy right whale (Caperea marginata) is a species of baleen whale. It may be a member of the cetotheres,  a family of baleen whales which until 2012 were thought to be extinct; C. marginata has otherwise been considered the monotypic taxon sole member of the family Neobalaenidae and is the only member of the genus Caperea. Despite its name, the pygmy right whale may have more in common with the gray whale and rorquals than the bowhead and right whales.

The pygmy right whale is found in temperate waters of the Southern Hemisphere, and feeds on copepods and euphausiids. Little is known about its population or social habits. Unlike most other baleen whales, it has rarely been subject to exploitation.

Taxonomy 
During the 1839-43 voyage of James Clark Ross, naturalists found bones and baleen plates resembling a smaller version of the right whale. In his Zoology of the Voyage of HMS Erebus and Terror (1846), John Edward Gray described the new species, naming it Balaena marginata. In 1864, Gray established a new genus (Caperea) after receiving a skull and some bones of another specimen. Six years later, in 1870, he added the name Neobalaena. He soon realized the three species were one and the same: Caperea marginata (caperea means "wrinkle" in Latin, "referring to the wrinkled appearance of the ear bone"; while marginata translates to "enclosed with a border", which "refers to the dark border around the baleen plates of some individuals"). In research findings published on December 18, 2012, paleontologist Felix Marx compared the skull bones of pygmy right whales to those of extinct cetaceans, finding it to be a close relative to the Cetotheriidae, making the pygmy right whale a living fossil.

In 2012, Italian palaeontologist Michelangelo Bisconti described Miocaperea pulchra, a first fossil pygmy right whale from Peru. This new genus differs from the living genus in some cranial details, but Bisconti's study confirmed the monophyly of the Neobalaenidae and he concluded that the rorqual-like features in C. marginata must be the result of parallel evolution. A second, undescribed species was tentatively assigned to Neobalaenidae in 2012.

Description 
The pygmy right whale is rarely encountered and consequently little studied. However, it is known that it is by far the smallest of the baleen whales. The longest male registered, was a  individual which had stranded in Cloudy Bay, Tasmania, while the longest female was a  individual which had stranded in Stanley, Tasmania in 1981. Gestation and lactation periods and longevity are all unknown. Part of the reason for the scarcity of data may be the relative inactivity of the whale, making location for study difficult. The blow is small and indistinct and the whale is usually a slow undulating swimmer, although capable of bursts of acceleration.

The coloring and shape of the pygmy right whale, dark gray dorsally and lighter gray ventrally, commonly with a pair of chevron-shaped lighter patches behind the eyes, is similar to that of the dwarf minke and Antarctic minke whales and at sea the species may easily be confused with these two species, in case the jaw and flippers are not carefully observed. The arched jawline is not as pronounced as other right whales and may not be sufficient to distinguish a pygmy right whale from a minke whale. The long, narrow cream-coloured baleen plates with a distinctive white gumline are the most effective discriminators. Unlike true right whales, pygmy rights do not have callosities. The dorsal fin is falcate (crescent-shaped) and located about three-quarters of the way along the back of the animal. Unlike the minke whales, occasionally the dorsal will not be seen on the whale surfacing. Like the minkes, though, it doesn't raise its flukes when it dives.

The skull and skeleton of the pygmy right whale is unlike those of any other extant whale: the supraoccipital shield extends farther posteriorly; the ear bone has a lateral wrinkle and is roughly square in outline.  All seven cervical vertebrae are fused, and the pygmy right has only 44 vertebrae. The 18 pairs of ribs are broad and flat, and make up 39–45% of the vertebral column (compared to 33% in other mysticetes). Each thoracic vertebrae has a pair of huge wing-like transverse processes, many of which overlap. The dorsal end of the ribs are remarkably thin and almost fail to make contact with the transverse processes. The reduced tail (or sacrocaudal region) features a vestigial pelvis and small chevron bones. The flippers have four digits. The lungs and heart are relatively small, which suggests that the pygmy right whale is not a deep diver. The larynx is reported to be different from any other cetacean.

Like other mysticetes, the pygmy right whale has a large laryngeal sac, but in contrast to other mysticetes, this sac is positioned on the right side of the midline in the pygmy right. The presence of this laryngeal sac can possibly be the explanation for the long thorax and flattened ribs, but the peculiar ribs have led to multiple speculations as to their origin.

Behavior and ecology 

Analysis of the stomach contents of dead pygmy right whales indicates that it feeds on copepods and euphausiids (krill). The social and mating structures are unknown. The whale is typically seen alone or in pairs, sometimes associated with other cetaceans (including dolphins, pilot whales, minke whales, and once a sei whale cow and calf).

The flukes, blubber, and baleen plates of a pygmy right whale calf were found in 7.47 m (24.5 ft) killer whale caught by whalers off South Africa.

Population and distribution 
The pygmy right whale is among the least studied cetaceans; until 2008, fewer than 25 sightings of the species had been made at sea. Individuals have been found on the coasts of Chile, Tierra del Fuego, Namibia, South Africa, Australia and New Zealand. One group may be a year-round resident off Tasmania. The total population is unknown. 

There is an extralimital stranding record in the Northern Hemisphere.

Whaling and whale-watching 
On account of its relatively small size and sparse distribution, the pygmy right whale has rarely been taken by whalers. A  male was taken off South Africa in 1917, and a couple were caught for scientific purposes by Soviet whalers in the South Atlantic in 1970. Also a few pygmy right whales are known to have been caught in fishing nets. These factors are not believed to have had a significant impact on the population.

Most data about pygmy right whales come from individual specimens washed up on coastlines; they are rarely encountered at sea and so they are not the primary subject of any whale watching cruises.

Conservation 
The pygmy right whale is listed on Appendix II  of the Convention on the Conservation of Migratory Species of Wild Animals (CMS). It is listed on Appendix II, as it has an unfavourable conservation status or would benefit significantly from international co-operation organised by tailored agreements.

The pygmy right whale is also covered by Memorandum of Understanding for the Conservation of Cetaceans and Their Habitats in the Pacific Islands Region (Pacific Cetaceans MOU).

See also
 List of cetaceans

References

Further reading 
 Encyclopedia of Marine Mammals, Perrin Wursig and Thewissen (eds). 
 Whales, Dolphins and Porpoises, Mark Carwardine. 
 National Audubon Society Guide to Marine Mammals of the World.

External links 

 

Baleen whales
Cetaceans of the Pacific Ocean
Mammals described in 1846
Taxa named by John Edward Gray